The 2012 Biathlon Junior World Championships was held in Kontiolahti, Finland from January 20 to January 26, 2012. There was to be a total of 16 competitions: sprint, pursuit, individual, mass start, and relay races for men and women.

Medal winners

Youth Women

Junior Women

Youth Men

Junior Men

Medal table

References

External links
Official IBU website 

Biathlon Junior World Championships
2012 in biathlon
2012 in Finnish sport
International sports competitions hosted by Finland
2012 in youth sport